Shahriyar, also spelled as Sharyar, Sheryar, Shariyar, Shahryar, Schahryar, Shahriar, Shariar, Sheharyar, Shaheryar, Shaharyar, Shehreyar, or Shehiryar, and pronounced /sha ree YAAR/, is originally a Persian name used as one of highest titles of nobility, which is equal to 'King' or 'Grand Duke'. In fact, Shahryar consists of two words, 'Shahr' (city) and 'Yar/Yār' (friend), leading the name to be sometimes translated as "the city of friend". Therefore, the name may have two meanings in the Persian language. For example, here are some lines of Persian poetry:

Ferdowsi:

The king told the Iranian people
The bad time has passed

Hafez:

This land was the city of friends and the origin of kind people
What happened to the kings and kindness?

Geography
Shahriar, a city in Tehran Province, Iran
Shahriar County, a county in Tehran Province
Shahriar, Chaharmahal and Bakhtiari, a village in Chaharmahal and Bakhtiari Province, Iran
Shahriar, Fars, a village in Fars Province, Iran
Shahriar-e Tavakkoli, a village in Fars Province, Iran
Shahriar, Lorestan, a village in Lorestan Province, Iran
Robat Karim, a city in Tehran Province, formerly called Shahriyar
Shagriar (disambiguation), various towns in Armenia
Shahryar (crater), a crater on Saturn's moon Enceladus

People
Mohammad-Hossein Shahriar, Mohammed Hussein Behjet, who uses the pen name Shahriar
Ishaq Shahryar, the Afghan ambassador to the United States
 Shahriyar (son of Khosrow II), Sassanid prince and the father of Yazdegerd III, the last king of the Sassanid Persia
 Shahryar (Mughal prince), younger brother of Mughal Emperor Shah Jahan
 Shakhriyar Mamedyarov, Azerbaijani chess player
 Shahryar, pen name of Akhlaq Mohammed Khan (1936–2012), Urdu poet, academic, and Bollywood lyricist
 Shahryar Khan, Pakistani former diplomat
 Shahriar Shafiq, assassinated Iranian navy officer and Ashraf Pahlavi's son
 Shahriar Shahriari, American mathematician and professor at Pomona College
 Meher Baba (born Merwan Sheriar Irani, 1894–1969), Indian spiritual leader

Fictional characters
Shahryar, the Sassanid king in The Book of One Thousand and One Nights

See also
 Shahriar (disambiguation)

Shahryar